Magtaf (also Romanized as Magtāf; also known as Maktāf, Mektāf, and Moktāf) is a village in Tarrah Rural District, Hamidiyeh District, Ahvaz County, Khuzestan Province, Iran. At the 2006 census, its population was 82, in 20 families.

References 

Populated places in Ahvaz County